Paçram may refer to:

Paçram, Shkodër, a settlement in Albania
Fadil Paçrami, Albanian former politician